Reckless but Happy is a South Korea variety show program on SBS starring Lee Sang-min, Seo Jang-hoon, Kim Jun-ho and Lee Sang-yeob. The show airs on SBS starting September 13, 2018 and ended on October 25, 2018. It was broadcast by SBS on Thursdays at 23:10 (KST).

Synopsis 
This is a show about 3 men who experienced divorce (Lee Sang-min, Seo Jang-hoon & Kim Jun-ho) and a man who experienced break-up (Lee Sang-yeob) travelling around the world to find their lost happiness after the end of their relationships.

Airtime

Episodes

Ratings

2018

 Ratings listed below are the individual corner ratings of Reckless but Happy. (Note: Individual corner ratings do not include commercial time, which regular ratings include.)
 Note for TNmS ratings, the ones listed is the highest ratings amongst ratings for each episodes.

Awards and Norminations

References

External links 
Official Website

Seoul Broadcasting System original programming
South Korean variety television shows
2018 South Korean television series debuts
Korean-language television shows